Maurice Chambreuil, born Jean-Camille Bourguignon (14 July 1883 in Paris - 4 November 1963 in Paris) was a French stage actor. He was actress Anémone's grand-father.

Comédie-Française 
 Entrance in 1925
 Named 395th sociétaire in 1937
 Leaves in 1954

Filmography 
 1911: La Fin de Don Juan by Victorin Jasset -  Le commandeur 
 1921: Le Rêve by Jacques de Baroncelli - Hubert
 1922:  by Jacques de Féraudy - himself
 1946: L'Idiot by Georges Lampin - General Ivan Fedorovitch Epantchine

External links 
 

1883 births
1963 deaths
20th-century French male actors
French male stage actors
Male actors from Paris
Sociétaires of the Comédie-Française